Condraoceras is a genus of liroceratids from the Pennsylvanian of North America and Lower Permian of Europe with a compressed, involute, nautiliconic shell; subcircular whorl section; small umbilicus with a rounded shoulder; suture with shallow ventral and lateral lobes; and narrow subcentral siphuncle.

Liroceras, from the same time and type of the family, differs in having a reniform whorl section and essentially straight sutures at maturity.  Peripetoceras, another related genus, has a flattened venter, slight ventral and lateral lobes in the suture, and a siphuncle offset dorsally from the center.

References

 Bernhard Kummel, 1964. Nautiloidea -Nautilida; Treatise on Invertebrate Paleontology, Part K. Geol Soc of America and Univ  of Kansas press, R.C. Moore (ed) -- Liroceratidae K444 -K447.

Prehistoric nautiloid genera
Pennsylvanian first appearances
Lopingian genus extinctions